Airport (also known as Newcastle Airport) is a Tyne and Wear Metro station, serving Newcastle International Airport, Newcastle upon Tyne in Tyne and Wear, England. It joined the network as a terminus station on 17 November 1991, following the opening of the extension from Bank Foot to Airport.

History
The majority of the route was already in place, with the alignment having been formerly served by the Ponteland and Darras Hall branch of the Blyth and Tyne Railway. The line opened in June 1905, closing to passenger services in June 1929, with goods services operating in to the late 1960s. The Airport branch only required the construction of a short distance (around 0.2 miles) of new right-of-way.

During the construction of the line, a dedicated bus service operated between Bank Foot and Newcastle International Airport.

In 2014, a survey conducted by the Consumers Association found that the Tyne and Wear Metro service from the Airport was one of the highest rated airport rail links in the country for customer satisfaction – scoring 85%. Only the rail link serving Birmingham International Airport was rated higher.

Facilities 
Step-free access is available at all stations across the Tyne and Wear Metro network, with a covered walkway providing step-free access from the terminal building to the ticket hall and platforms. The station is equipped with ticket machines, waiting shelter, seating, next train information displays, timetable posters, and an emergency help point. Ticket machines are able to accept payment with credit and debit card (including contactless payment), notes and coins. The station is fitted with automatic ticket barriers, which were installed at 13 stations across the network during the early 2010s, as well as smartcard validators, which feature at all stations.

There is no dedicated car or bicycle parking available at the station, with car parking controlled and operated by the airport. A taxi rank is located to the front of the terminal building.

Services 
, the station is served by up to five trains per hour on weekdays and Saturday, and up to four trains per hour during the evening and on Sunday.

Rolling stock used: Class 599 Metrocar

References

External links
 
Timetable and station information for Airport

Airport railway stations in the United Kingdom
Newcastle upon Tyne
1991 establishments in England
Railway stations in Great Britain opened in 1991
Tyne and Wear Metro Green line stations
Transport in Newcastle upon Tyne
Transport in Tyne and Wear
